Beauty and the Bull is a 1954 Warner Bros. biographical short film.

The film described the bullfighting career of actress turned toreador, Bette Ford. It was directed by Larry Lansburgh, written by Janet Lansburgh, and narrated by Marvin Miller. It is 17 minutes long, and was made using Warner Bros. Warnercolor film, and Vitaphone sound-on-disc technology.

The film was nominated in 1955 for an Academy Award in the  Best Short Subject, Two Reel, category.

Sources

External links 
 "Beauty and the Bull" at IMDb.com

1954 short films
1950s English-language films
American biographical films
American short films
Bullfighting films
Warner Bros. short films
1950s biographical films
Films about cattle
1950s American films